Interview with a Madman is a hip hop album by Australian criminal Mark "Chopper" Read, released on Rott'n Records on March 13, 2006. Read's foray into music features gritty tales of organised crime, jail time and ear mutilation, and he is supported by beats and guest appearances from Hyjak N Torcha, Justice, Lazy Grey, Lotek, Matty B, Necro, Phrase and various other hip hop artists. Music videos were made for the tracks "Night With Chopper" and "Remember Me".

Track listing

External links 
 Interview with a Madman at Discogs

References

2006 debut albums
Mark "Chopper" Read albums